Mohamed Baksh (born 5 February 1945) is a former West Indian cricket umpire. He stood in one ODI game in 1983.

See also
 List of One Day International cricket umpires

References

1945 births
Living people
West Indian One Day International cricket umpires
Guyanese cricket umpires